Kessler or Keßler (in German) may refer to:
 Kessler (automobile), an American automobile made 1921–1922
 Kessler (name), people named Kessler
 Kessler (TV series), a British television series from 1981
 Kessler, Ohio, an unincorporated community, United States
 Kessler, West Virginia, an unincorporated community, United States
 Kessler Syndrome, a scenario, proposed by NASA consultant Donald J. Kessler, involving space debris
 Kessler Whiskey, an American brand of blended whiskey

See also 
 Kesler, a German and Jewish surname
 Greg Kelser (born 1957), American basketball player